Pauhunri is a mountain in the Eastern Himalayas. It is located on the border of Sikkim, India and Tibet and is situated about 75 km northeast of Kangchenjunga. It marks the origin of Teesta river.

First ascent 
Unknown at the time, it was revealed 80 years later that this climb made Pauhunri the highest climbed summit on Earth from 1911 to 1930.

See also
List of Ultras of the Himalayas
Paohanli Peak

References

International mountains of Asia
Mountains of Sikkim
Mountains of Tibet
Seven-thousanders of the Himalayas